"Love My Life" is a song by British singer-songwriter Robbie Williams, released as the second single from his eleventh studio album The Heavy Entertainment Show (2016). The single was released in the United Kingdom on 20 November 2016. The song was written by Williams, Johnny McDaid, and Gary Go. It was produced by McDaid with additional production by Go and Jonny Coffer. It topped the charts in Slovakia and Slovenia.

Background
During his appearance on RTL Late Night on 2 November 2016, Williams said that the song was "about positivity and making the most of your life. I have a son called Charlton Valentine and a daughter called Theodora Rose Williams. I have been to rehab twice and had lots of therapy. I realised that what happens to you when you become older is because of you when you were a kid. So this song is about hope and spreading positivity instead of negativity."

Charts

Weekly charts

Year-end charts

Certifications

References

External links
 Official song at YouTube

2016 songs
Robbie Williams songs
Songs written by Robbie Williams
2016 singles